A list of films produced in the Soviet Union in 1935 (see 1935 in film).

1935

See also
1935 in the Soviet Union

External links
 Soviet films of 1935 at the Internet Movie Database

1935
Soviet
Films